Kids Incorporated (also known as Kids Inc.) is an American children's television program that began production in the mid-1980s and continued airing well into the early 1990s. It was largely a youth-oriented program with musical performances as an integral part of every episode. The pilot episode was shot on September 1, 1983, and the series aired in syndication from September 1, 1984, to May 25, 1986, and on the Disney Channel from November 3, 1986, to January 9, 1994. Reruns aired on the Disney Channel until May 30, 1996.

Plot
The show revolves around a group of children and teenagers who performed in their own rock group, Kids Incorporated. They struggled to deal with issues ranging from crushes to peer pressure to child abuse, while performing regularly at a local former music club called The P*lace, which was really called The Palace, but the "a" in the sign burned out and was not replaced. The action took place on abstract "stagey" sets and the plots involved many fantasy elements, such as the group meeting a robot (Season 1, Episode 10), a runaway princess (Season 1, Episode 6) and even a wise-cracking bicycle (Season 1, Episode 17). In addition to their performances on stage, the group would break into song when they were off-stage.

Cast and characters
For many of the cast members, dancers and musicians, the show was the beginning of a successful career in the entertainment industry. The most visible stars are: 
  
 Renee Sands and Stacy "Fergie" Ferguson, both of whom were founding members of pop trio Wild Orchid. Fergie later joined the Grammy Award-winning group the Black Eyed Peas, then launched her successful solo career. During her tenure on Kids Incorporated, she went from being the youngest to the oldest and holds the record for the longest run at six seasons, including the pilot. 
 Martika (a.k.a. Marta Marrero) became a singer with two hit studio records in the late 1980s-early 1990s ("Toy Soldiers"); she began using the mononym Martika billing during her time on the series.
 Mario Lopez (Saved by the Bell, Pacific Blue, Extra and Dancing with the Stars) - Lopez appeared as a background dancer and musician throughout the series.
 Eric Balfour (24, Haven, Skyline)
 Jennifer Love Hewitt, who was credited simply as "Love Hewitt", (Party of Five, I Know What You Did Last Summer, Ghost Whisperer, Criminal Minds, 9-1-1) 
 Brian Friedman (bass guitarist, keyboards, keytar) – 1991–1994
 Brian Poth (keytarist, bass guitar, tambourine) – 1987–1988
 Shanice Wilson (keyboards, vocals) - 1984
 Rahsaan Patterson gained experience as a backup vocalist for several artists including Brandy Norwood and Tevin Campbell.

Guest stars
Guest stars included both established celebrities and newcomers. Gwen Verdon, Kathy Johnson, Barry Williams, Florence Henderson (both former stars of The Brady Bunch), Billy Blanks, David Hasselhoff, John Franklin, Ryan Bollman, Christian Hoff, Paul Rodriguez, Brian Robbins, and Ruth Buzzi were among those who appeared during the run of the show. Young actors who guest starred on it included Brittany Murphy (1992), Scott Wolf, Audra Lee (2 episodes), R.J. Williams, Jason Hervey, and Jeff Cohen (Chunk from The Goonies).

Episodes

Music
Music was an integral part of the show and five songs were included in every episode. The musical variety ranged over a number of different genres released from the 1960s onward. While these numbers were usually performed onstage in the context of a concert at The P*lace, they were also occasionally used to illustrate a character's internal monologue or conflict. The vocal responsibilities were shared by all five (or six) singers; every cast member was given an opportunity to perform featured or solo songs throughout the course of the season.

Each episode consisted of one original number and generally five previously recorded songs by recognized artists. Artists and songs ranged from the 1950s to the 1990s. The original songs were written by the hired composers of the show. Depending on the year those composers were Michael Cruz, Andrew R. Powell, Craig Sharmat, and others.

Due to the age of both the performers and the target demographic, lyrics with objectionable content were generally edited out of the songs and replaced with more appropriate language such as "Jump Around" by House of Pain and "Hip Hop Hooray" by Naughty by Nature. However, occasionally songs were performed as written, slightly objectionable lyrics intact. Examples of uncensored songs that were presented on the series include "Dancing with Myself" by Billy Idol ("The Storybook House" episode, 1990), "Seven Wonders" by Fleetwood Mac (1988), "Prove Your Love" by Taylor Dayne (although this had a slight edit on the chorus as "I wanna see your body dance with mine"), and "Smooth Criminal" by Michael Jackson (1990).

Production and broadcast history
The original pilot for the show was produced in 1983 and shopped to several networks by creators Thomas W. Lynch and Gary Biller.

The show was not picked up by a major network, but, distributed by MGM/UA Entertainment Co. Television, began a syndicated run on September 1, 1984. The original four cast members, Stacy Ferguson, Marta Marrero, Renee Sands, and Jerry Sharell, were joined by Rahsaan Patterson and a company of five backup dancers. Sharell left after the first season, in part over unhappiness with the show's often bizarre and outlandish storylines.

In syndication, the shows airing depended on decisions made by local television stations. For example, KTRV in Boise, Idaho aired it at first on Tuesday, then Saturday nights at 6:30 PM, while WNBC in New York City aired it first on Sundays at 1:00 PM then moved it to 9:00 AM. KPTV in Portland, Oregon first aired it Saturday mornings at 10:30 AM, then moved it back to 9:30 AM. WCLQ (now WQHS) in Cleveland aired it Saturday mornings at 6:30 AM. The shuffling time slots affected the ratings, and it was cancelled the weekend of May 25, 1986. Reruns aired on CBN (now Freeform) from 1985 to 1986.

It was due to the positive ratings from the CBN reruns that in Summer 1986, the show was given a second chance when the Disney Channel acquired the rights to it. It resumed production with the same cast, and new episodes began airing on November 3, 1986. Disney's buyout package also included the entire syndicated run; as such, edits had to be made to remove fee plugs and commercial outros.  Its main timeslot on the Disney Channel was 5:00 PM ET/4:00 PM CT.

After the sixth season (1989–1990) was filmed, the show was put on hiatus for a year, during which time most of the cast moved on to other projects or "aged out". The only two who were invited to return in 1991 when it resumed production were Kenny Ford and Jennifer Love Hewitt.

Budget cuts and the expiration of Disney's lease with MGM prompted another hiatus in 1993, after only ten episodes of Season 9 had been filmed. The last episode aired on January 9, 1994. The show continued to be shown in reruns on the Disney Channel until May 30, 1996. It is still the longest running show in Disney Channel's history.

The show was filmed at Hollywood Center Studios, but later moved to Sunset Gower Studios.

Producers
Throughout its history, other producers and production companies were associated with the show, including
K-tel Entertainment, Lynch-Biller Productions (later Lynch Entertainment; now The Tom Lynch Company), RHI Entertainment, and MGM Television (a.k.a. MGM-Pathé). Hal Roach Studios/Qintex, the studio responsible for the Our Gang (Little Rascals) short films series of the 1930s, was also involved with it.

The show essentially launched the careers of creators and producers Gary Biller and Thomas W. Lynch, who would go on to create The Secret World of Alex Mack and Romeo! (for Nickelodeon) among many other shows, leading the New York Times to call him "the David E. Kelley of 'tween TV". Prior to it, Lynch and Biller created and produced a long-running music video series for TBS, Night Tracks.

Merchandise

Kids Incorporated: The Beginning and other videos
The 1983 pilot was recorded in August 1983 but never shown on television; however, in 1985, it was released on VHS as Kids Incorporated: The Beginning. In order to include Rahsaan Patterson, who joined the show after the pilot was shot, a new storyline was edited into the film. His character, Kid, was depicted as the new kid in town, who was very shy and afraid to audition for the group. He also revealed the origins of them. The "Kid" scenes were filmed in 1985, and edited in, with the 1983 footage of the rest of the cast or in with it.

Two additional videos were released in 1985, entitled ChartBusters and The Best of Kids Incorporated. While the show was still in syndication, four albums were also released, titled
 Kids Incorporated (1983)
 Kids Incorporated (1984)
 Kids Incorporated: The Chart Hits (1985)
 Kids Incorporated: New Attitude (1985)
At least two of these achieved platinum sales status. No further ones were released when the show moved to the Disney Channel because the company that produced them, K-Tel Records, filed for bankruptcy at around the same time.

International versions

Japan
An original Japanese adaptation of the show, titled StarS, ran from 1999 to 2001. Between 13 and 26 episodes were filmed in each of its three seasons. A second version, StarS2, was scheduled to premiere on MBS in the summer of 2007. Both were produced by TOEI and co-produced by Sunrise Studios.

In addition, the American version, dubbed into Japanese, was shown on the MBS network until 2001.

New Zealand
The original New Zealand version of the show, High Life, began production in 1990. It ran periodically for five seasons, broadcasting six episodes per year, until 1995, when TVNZ-2 cancelled it.

Canada
The Rockets (aired on CKY Television in 1987, 1989 and 1991) is sort of a Canadian Kids Incorporated.

References

External links
 
 "Hollywood Reporter Salutes 100 episodes of Kids Incorporated" 1989-1990
 The Unofficial Kids Incorporated Show Music/Video Page

1984 American television series debuts
1994 American television series endings
1980s American children's comedy television series
1990s American children's comedy television series
1980s American musical comedy television series
1990s American musical comedy television series
American children's musical television series
Child musical groups
Disney Channel original programming
English-language television shows
Fictional musical groups
First-run syndicated television programs in the United States
Television series about children
Television series about teenagers
Television series by MGM Television
American television series revived after cancellation